The discography of Opeth, a Stockholm, Sweden-based progressive metal band, consists of thirteen studio albums, four live albums, three box sets, three video albums and seventeen singles.

Opeth was formed in 1990 by vocalist David Isberg. He later recruited bassist Mikael Åkerfeldt without the consent of the other band members he previously hired, which resulted in the departure of all members except Isberg and Åkerfeldt. Isberg soon left, but Åkerfeldt decided to remain in the band and keep it in activity. For this he contacted guitarist Peter Lindgren, bassist Johan De Farfalla, and drummer Anders Nordin. With this lineup, they recorded a demo, which led to the band’s first record label contract. Candlelight Records signed the band. In 1995, Opeth released their first studio album, Orchid, and after more changes to the lineup, the band released Morningrise and My Arms, Your Hearse in 1996 and 1998 respectively.

Åkerfeldt and Lindgren, the two remaining members of the band, asked drummer Martin Lopez and bassist Martín Méndez to join the band, both of whom accepted. In 1999, they released the concept album Still Life. Steven Wilson joined Opeth in the studio for their fifth album, 2001's Blackwater Park, producing and providing extra backing vocals and instruments. The band supported the album with their first worldwide tour. After promoting the album, Opeth entered the studio again, recording two albums. The first album, Deliverance that was released in 2002, debuted at number 19 on the Top Heatseekers in the United States. The second album, Damnation was released a year later, and peaked at number 192 on the Billboard 200. Per Wiberg joined the band as a keyboardist and recorded Ghost Reveries, which peaked at number 64 on the Billboard 200. Lopez and Lindgren both left Opeth and were replaced by Martin Axenrot and Fredrik Åkesson. In 2008, the band released their ninth studio album Watershed, which debuted at number 23 on the Billboard 200 and peaked at the top of the Finnish charts. Their tenth studio album Heritage which released in 2011, debuted at number 19 on the Billboard 200, at number 2 on the US Hard Rock Albums and at number 6 on the Rock Albums charts, making it highest charting record to date. The album also peaked at number 22 on the UK Albums chart.

Joakim Svalberg became the band's new keyboardist in 2011. Their 2014 album Pale Communion achieved some of the band's highest international chart placements, reaching number one in Finland and the top five in several other countries. Their 2016 album Sorceress reached number 1 in Germany and the top ten in several other countries. Their latest album In Cauda Venenum was released in September 2019.

Albums

Studio albums

Live albums

Video albums

Compilation albums

Box sets

Singles

Music videos

References

External links

 www.opeth.com — Opeth's official website

Heavy metal group discographies
Discography
Discographies of Swedish artists